Mawlana (Arabic:مولانا), originally published under the title Our Protector, is 2012 a novel by Egyptian journalist Ibrahim Issa. It covers many topics, including some Islamic problems about the Prophet's hadith, the Mu'tazilah, Shi'ism, the people of dhimmis, terrorism, and the sheikhs of satellite channels. Sheikh Hatem Al-Shennawi, who was called as "Mawlana" in the novel, is the main character in the story. He is a model for a flexible and cheerful preacher “Daeia” who takes into account the circumstances and requirements of this generation.

The most important features of this huge novel, which has 554 pages, is that it contains a linguistic texture in which the language, in the heritage language that is still able to communicate, the language of the Qur’an, hadith, jurisprudence and interpretation, and this is accompanied by the social, religious and political horizon and the writer’s point of view.

The novel will be turned into a series and will directed by Amro Arafa, Khaled Abu Al-Naja is the movie mine character. The novel was nominated for the International Prize for Arabic Fiction in 2013.

Ibrahim Issa says about the novel: “I started writing this novel in 2009 while I was opposing the former president, during my trials, and then my dismissal from the constitution. Writing until last March 2012, it is one of the dearest novels to my heart."

References 

Arabic-language novels
2012 novels
Egyptian novels